Audencia Business School is a French grande école and business school located in Nantes, France. It is one of the only 0.5% of business schools in the world accredited by the Association of MBAs (AMBA), European Quality Improvement System (EQUIS), and the Association to Advance Collegiate Schools of Business (AACSB). Audencia is also BSIS labelled. The school enrolls 6,100 students from almost 90 countries on bachelors, international masters, specialised masters, MBAs, doctorates and executive education courses.

Audencia is often ranked in the top 12 business schools in France . In 2022, the Financial Times ranked its Masters in Management program 47th in the world. Audencia's Full-Time MBA was ranked 58th in the MBA ranking 2018 by CNN expansion and 90th in the world by The Economist (October 2018).

History
Audencia  was founded in 1900 as the École Supérieure de Commerce de Nantes. Until 1970, the school occupied the building which is today home to the city's natural history museum. It then moved into a purpose-built campus of 23,000 m2 to the north of the city centre opposite Nantes University.

In 2000, the school changed its name to Audencia Nantes School of Management. The name "Audencia" is a blend of two words: audientia, which means "listening," and audacia or "boldness."

Since 2004, the school has been associated with the Global Compact, a United Nations initiative that brings together firms, the business world and the civil society united on ten universal principles relative to human rights, working conditions and the environment.

In 2015, the school was reaccredited by the three global accreditations (AMBA, EQUIS, AACSB) for the maximum period of five years.

In 2016, the school changed its name to Audencia Business School which includes the bachelor and masters programmes of former schools SciencesCom and the Ecole Atlantique de Commerce.

In 2017, the school adopted a new legal status and became a public-private partnership (École consulaire or EESC) largely financed by the public Chambers of Commerce in Nantes St-Nazaire.

Grande école degrees 

Audencia is an École consulaire (EESC), a private institution of higher education funded and supervised by the city of Nantes, the local council and the chamber of commerce and industry. As a member of the Conférence des grandes écoles, Audencia has the status of a Grande école. Grandes écoles are elite French institutions of higher education that are separate from, but parallel and often connected to, the main framework of the French public university system. Grandes écoles admit students through an extremely competitive process, and a significant proportion of their graduates occupy the highest levels of French society. Similar to Ivy League schools in the United States, Russell Group in the UK, and C9 League in China, graduation from a grande école is considered the prerequisite credential for any top government, administrative and corporate position in France.

The degrees are accredited by the Conférence des Grandes Écoles and awarded by the Ministry of National Education (France). Higher education business degrees in France are organized into three levels thus facilitating international mobility: the Licence / Bachelor's degrees, and the Master's and Doctorat degrees. The Bachelors and the Masters are organized in semesters: 6 for the Bachelors and 4 for the Masters. Those levels of study include various "parcours" or paths based on UE (Unités d'enseignement or Modules), each worth a defined number of European credits (ECTS). A student accumulates those credits, which are generally transferable between paths. A Bachelors is awarded once 180 ECTS have been obtained (bac + 3); a Masters is awarded once 120 additional credits have been obtained (bac +5). The highly coveted PGE (Grand Ecole Program) ends with the degree of Master's in Management (MiM)

Audencia Business School is also accredited by EQUIS (European Quality Improvement System), AACSB (Association to Advance Collegiate Schools of Business) and Association of MBAs (AMBA). It is among the top 1% business school in the world to have the triple crown (Triple accreditation). Of the 13,670 schools offering business degree programs worldwide, only 89 have triple accreditation as of May 2018.

Academic programmes
Audencia Master in Management (Grande école programme) – Four years including one in-company. 
Audencia Full-Time MBA – Taught in English over a 12-month period. 
Executive MBA – 18 months part-time, taught in French, with international seminars in English.
Euro*MBA – Executive programme run by a consortium of six European business schools including Audencia Nantes. Taught over 24 months through distance learning and six European residential weeks.
MSc in Management-Engineering – An English-language programme followed by students from around 20 French and foreign engineering schools. An 18-month course with a study period abroad. Ranked 55th in the world in the Financial Times’ masters in management ranking (September 2020).
European and International Business Management Programme (EIBM) – Trilingual (English, French, Spanish) programme in 12 and 14-month formats taught in three countries. Run by Audencia Nantes and two academic partners in the UK and Spain. 
International Master in Management (IMM) – Year-long programme taught in English with the possibility of studying on the campus of one of eight exclusive partners. 
Master Supply Chain and Purchasing Management – English-taught double degree split between Audencia Nantes and MIP Politecnico di Milano (Italy). Available in 12 or 18-month formats.
MSc in Food and Agribusiness Management – a 15-month programme in partnership with ESPM (Escola Superior de Propaganda e marketing), Brazil and with the support of the Crédit Agricole. Taught 100% in English.
MSc in Management and Entrepreneurship in the Creative Economy (MSc MECE) – an 18-month programme taught in English in partnership with the Innovation School of The Glasgow school of Art. 
Bachelor in Management – Three-year programme. Admission possible in year three after prior studies.
Bachelor of Business Administration (BBA) – Four year programme with the fourth year split between studies and in-company period. Specialisations in agribusiness or purchasing.
Masters programme Communications and Media – Three-year programme including 15 months of internships.`
Masters programme Public policy Management – in partnership with Sciences Po Lille
Specialised masters accredited by the French Conférence des Grandes Ecoles and taught in French
-	Management of Sports Organisations 
-	Management and International Competences 
-	Marketing Design & Création
-	Global Purchasing and Supply Chain Management 
-	Finance, Risk, Control
-	Marketing Strategies for the Digital Age
-	Business Development
DBA Audencia Business School – Toulouse Business School
DBA in Responsible Management, Audencia Business School –  Tsinghua University, Beijing
DBA Audencia Business School – Western Business School of China, Chengdu
Executive Education

Partnerships and alliances 
Within France, Audencia entered an alliance with the École Centrale de Nantes and the Nantes École Nationale Supérieure d’Architecture (ensa Nantes) to promote engineering, management, architecture and creativity to enrich the teaching, research, corporate relations and international scope of all three schools.
The school signed its first agreement with a non-French academic institution in 1972. Today, Audencia has more than 230 international partners. While the earliest accords concerned North American business schools (especially those in the USA), the school now has partnerships throughout the world.

Australia 

 RMIT University
 University of Adelaide

Austria 

 MCI Management Center Innsbruck

Belgium 

 Solvay Brussels School of Economics and Management
 KU Leuven

Canada 

 HEC Montréal
 Queens University
 Université Laval
 University of Ottawa
 University of Victoria

China 

 Beijing Institute of Technology
 Southwestern University of Finance and Economics
 The Hong Kong Polytechnic University

Colombia 

 University of Los Andes (Colombia)
 Universidad Externado de Colombia

Finland 

 Aalto University School of Business

Germany 

 WHU – Otto Beisheim School of Management
 HHL Leipzig Graduate School of Management
Kühne Logistics University (KLU)
 FOM University of Applied Sciences for Economics and Management
 University of Freiburg

India 

 Indian Institute of Management Bangalore
 XLRI - Xavier School of Management
 Institute of Management Technology, Ghaziabad
 Indian Institute of Management Kozhikode
 Indian Institute of Management Raipur

Ireland 

 UCD Quinn School of Business

Italy 

 MIP Politecnico di Milano
 Università Commerciale Luigi Bocconi
 LIUC Università Carlo Cattaneo
 LUISS Guido Carli

Japan 

 Nagoya University

Korea 

 Kyungpook National University

Netherlands 

 Maastricht University
 Rotterdam School of Management, Erasmus University

New Zealand 

 University of Canterbury

Poland 

 Kozminski University

Portugal 

 Católica Lisbon School of Business & Economics
 Nova School of Business and Economics

Russia 

 Higher School of Economics
 Saint Petersburg State University Graduate School of Management

Spain 

 Universidad Carlos III de Madrid
 EADA Business School

Sweden 

 University of Gothenburg

United Kingdom 

 Aston Business School
 Cardiff Business School
 Strathclyde Business School
 Loughborough University
 University of Exeter

United States 

 University of California, Berkeley
 Boston University
 Bowling Green State University
California State University, Fullerton

Alumni
Audencia Business School has several alumni as follows:
 Othman El Ferdaous : former Minister of culture, youth, and sports of Morroco; Vice president of growth at ABA Technology.
 Jean Arthuis : French Politician.
 Olivier Duha : Founder, Chairman & CEO of Webhelp

References

External links
 Audencia Business School

Business schools in France
Buildings and structures in Nantes
Educational institutions established in 1900
Education in Nantes
1900 establishments in France